The IBM 727 Magnetic Tape Unit was announced for the IBM 701 and IBM 702 on September 25, 1953. It became IBM's standard tape drive for their early vacuum-tube era computer systems. Later vacuum-tube machines and first-generation transistor computers used the IBM 729-series tape drive. The 727 was withdrawn on May 12, 1971.

The tape had seven parallel tracks – six for data and one to maintain parity. Tapes with character data (BCD) were recorded in even parity. Binary tapes used odd parity. Aluminum strips were glued several feet from the ends of the tape to serve as logical beginning and end of tape markers. Write protection was provided by a removable plastic ring in the back of the tape reel.

References

727
Tape 727